Petrakovskaya is a rural locality (a village) in Shelotskoye Rural Settlement, Verkhovazhsky District, Vologda Oblast, Russia. The population was 15 as of 2002.

Geography 
Petrakovskaya is located 62 km southwest of Verkhovazhye (the district's administrative centre) by road. Makarovskaya is the nearest rural locality.

References 

Rural localities in Verkhovazhsky District